The individual dressage at the 2008 Summer Olympics took place between 13 and 19 August, at the Hong Kong Sports Institute.

The first round of the individual dressage competition is the same FEI Grand Prix Test used for the team dressage event. The Grand Prix Test consists of a battery of required movements that each rider and horse pair performs. Five judges evaluate the pair, giving marks between 0 and 10 for each element. The judges' scores were averaged to give a final score for the pair.

The top 25 individual competitors in that round advance to the individual-only competitions, though each nation was limited to three pairs advancing. This second round consisted of a Grand Prix Special Test, which used the same movements as the first round's Grand Prix Test but required the pair to complete them in a shorter time. The 15 best pairs in the Grand Prix Special Test advanced to the final round. In that round, the Grand Prix Freestyle Test, competitors designed their own choreography set to music. Judges in that round evaluated the artistic merit of the performance and music as well as the technical aspects of the dressage. Final scores were based on the average of the Freestyle and Special Test results.

Medalists

Results

References

External links
 Competition format
 Results Summary

Equestrian at the 2008 Summer Olympics